Islam is the second-largest religion in South Asia, with more than 600 million Muslims living there, forming about one-third of the region's population. History of Islam in South Asia started along the coastal regions of the Indian subcontinent and Sri Lanka, almost as soon as it started in the Arabian Peninsula, as the Arab traders brought it to South Asia. South Asia has the largest population  of Muslims in the world, with about one-third of all Muslims living here. Islam is the dominant religion in half of the South Asian countries (Pakistan, Maldives, Bangladesh and Afghanistan). It is the second largest religion in India and third largest in Sri Lanka and Nepal.

According to legend, the first Indian Masjid was built in 624 AD at Kodungallur in present-day Kerala with the mandate of the last the ruler (the Cheraman Perumal), who converted to Islam during the lifetime of the Islamic prophet Muhammad (c. 570–632). On a similar note, Tamil Muslims on the eastern coast also claim that they converted to Islam in Muhammad's lifetime. The local mosques date to the early 700s. Malik Dinar was one of the first known Muslims to have come to India in order to propagate Islam in the Indian Subcontinent after Cheraman Perumal. According to Qissat Shakarwati Farmad, the Masjids at Kodungallur, Kollam, Madayi, Barkur, Mangalore, Kasaragod, Kannur, Dharmadam, Panthalayini, and Chaliyam, were built during the era of Malik Dinar, and they are among the oldest Masjids in Indian Subcontinent.  Historicaly, the Barwada Mosque in Ghogha, Gujarat built before 623 CE, Cheraman Juma Mosque (629 CE) in Methala, Kerala and Palaiya Jumma Palli (630 CE) in Kilakarai, Tamil Nadu are three of the first mosques in South Asia.

The first incursion occurred through sea by Caliph Umar's governor of Bahrain, Usman ibn Abu al-Aas, who sent his brother Hakam ibn Abu al-Aas to raid and reconnoitre the Makran region around 636 CE or 643 AD long before any Arab army reached the frontier of India by land. Al-Hakim ibn Jabalah al-Abdi, who attacked Makran in the year 649 AD, was an early partisan of Ali ibn Abu Talib. During the caliphate of Ali, many Hindu Jats of Sindh had come under the influence of Shi'ism and some even participated in the Battle of Camel and died fighting for Ali. According to popular tradition, Islam was brought to Lakshadweep islands, situated just to the west of Malabar Coast, by Ubaidullah in 661 CE.

After the Rashidun Caliphate, the role of Islam was significantly diminished throughout the Muslim world including South Asia as Muslim political dynasties came to power.

Origins

Islamic influence first came to be felt in the Indian subcontinent during the early 7th century with the advent of Arab traders. Arab traders used to visit the Malabar region to trade even before Islam had been established in Arabia. According to Historians Elliot and Dowson in their book The History of India as told by its own Historians, the first ship bearing Muslim travelers was seen on the Indian coast as early as 630 CE. The first Indian mosque is thought to have been built in 629 CE, purportedly at the behest of an unknown Chera dynasty ruler, during the lifetime of Muhammad in Kodungallur, in district of Thrissur, Kerala by Malik Bin Deenar. In Malabar, Muslims are called Mappila.

H. G. Rawlinson, in his book Ancient and Medieval History of India, claims the first Arab Muslims settled on the Indian coast in the last part of the 7th century. This fact is corroborated, by J. Sturrock in his South Kanara and Madras Districts Manuals, and also by Haridas Bhattacharya in Cultural Heritage of India Vol. IV.

The Arab merchants and traders became the carriers of the new religion and they propagated it wherever they went. It was, however, the subsequent expansion of the Muslim conquest in the Indian subcontinent over the next millennia that established Islam in the region.

According to Derryl N. Maclean, a link between Sindh and early partisans of Ali or proto-Shi'ites can be traced to Hakim ibn Jabalah al-Abdi, who traveled across Sind to Makran in the year 649AD and presented a report on the area to the Caliph. He supported Ali, and died fighting on his behalf alongside Sindhi Jats.

During the reign of Ali, many Jats came under the influence of Islam. Harith ibn Murrah Al-abdi and Sayfi ibn Fil' al-Shaybani, both officers of Ali's army, attacked Sindhi bandits and chased them to Al-Qiqan (present-day Quetta) in the year 658. Sayfi was one of the seven partisans of Ali who were beheaded alongside Hujr ibn Adi al-Kindi in 660AD, near Damascus. After the Islamic conquest of Persia was completed, the Muslim Arabs then began to move towards the lands east of Persia and in 652 captured Herat.

Political dynasties (Umayyads - 1947)

Under the Umayyads (661 – 750 AD), many Shias sought asylum in the region of Sindh, to live in relative peace in the remote area. In 712 CE, a young Arab general Muhammad bin Qasim conquered most of the Indus region for the Umayyad Empire, to be made the "As-Sindh" province with its capital at Al-Mansurah. Arab tribes became rebellious in Sindh in the early 9th century during the Abbasid period. During a period of strife in 841-2 between Yemeni and Hijazi tribes, 'Umar bin Abdul Aziz al-Habbari's Hijazi faction assassinated the pro-Yemeni Abbasid governor of Sindh, Imran bin Musa Barmaki, leaving Umar bin Abdul Aziz al-Habbari as the de facto governor of Sindh. According to al-Ya'qubi, Umar's request to be formally appointed governor was granted in 854 by the Abbasid caliph Al-Mutawakkil. 

By the mid-800s, the Banu Munabbih (also known as the Banu Sama), who claimed descent from the Prophet Muhammad's Quraysh tribe came to rule Multan, and established the Emirate, which ruled for the next century. At the opening of 10th century, Ibn Rusta was first to report a well established Emirate  of Multan. Muhammad III, whose full name was Muhammad bin al-Qasim bin Munabbih, was reported by  Al-Biruni to be the first of the Banu Munabbih (Samid) rulers of Multan - he conquered Multan and issued silver dammas bearing his Hindu epithet "Mihiradeva" ("Sun god") on the reverse. By the mid 10th century, Multan had come under the influence of the Qarmatians. The Qarmatians had been expelled from Egypt and Iraq following their defeat at the hands of the Abbasids there. They wrested control of the city from the pro-Abbasid Amirate of Banu Munabbih, and pledged allegiance to the Fatimid Caliphate based in  Cairo instead of Abbasid Caliphate at Baghdad. By the end of the 10th century CE, the region was ruled by several Hindu Shahi kings who would be subdued by the Ghaznavids. Sunni Islam arrived in North India in the 12th century via the invasions of Ghurids conquest.

According to Ibn Batuta, the Khaljis encouraged conversion to Islam by making it a custom to have the convert presented to the Sultan who would place a robe on the convert and award him with bracelets of gold. During Delhi Sultanate's Ikhtiyar Uddin Bakhtiyar Khilji's control of the Bengal, Muslim missionaries in India achieved their greatest success, in terms of number of converts to Islam.

The Mughal Empire, founded by Babur, a direct descendant of Timur and Genghis Khan, was able to conquer almost the entirety of South Asia. Although religious tolerance was seen during the rule of emperor Akbar's, the reign under emperor Aurangzeb witnessed the full establishment of Islamic sharia and the re-introduction of Jizya (a special tax imposed upon non-Muslims) through the compilation of the Fatawa-e-Alamgiri. The Mughals, already suffering a gradual decline in the early 18th century, was invaded by the Afsharid ruler Nader Shah. The Mughal decline provided opportunities for the Maratha Empire, Sikh Empire, Mysore Kingdom, Nawabs of Bengal and Murshidabad and Nizams of Hyderabad to exercise control over large regions of the Indian subcontinent. Eventually, after numerous wars sapped its strength, the Mughal Empire was broken into smaller powers like Shia Nawab of Bengal, the Nawab of Awadh, the Nizam of Hyderabad, and the Kingdom of Mysore, which became the major Asian economic and military power on the Indian subcontinent. Muslim power quickly vaporized in the early 18th century after their defeat in wars and attacks. Mughals were replaced with Rajputs, the Marathas, Sikhs in Punjab, the Jats and smaller Muslim states competing for power with the British East India Company. Islamic scholars reacted slowly to the British rule. The British authorities' westernisation policies effectively destroyed the exclusive hold of the ulama over education and curtailed their administrative influence. After Mughal India's collapse, Tipu Sultan's Kingdom of Mysore based in South India, which witnessed partial establishment of sharia-based economic and military policies i.e. Fathul Mujahidin, replaced Bengal ruled by the Nawabs of Bengal as South Asia's foremost economic territory. The partition was outlined in the Indian Independence Act 1947 and resulted in the dissolution of the British Raj, i.e., Crown rule in India. Hyderabad, the last major Muslim princely state, was annexed in 1948 by the modern Republic of India.

Modern states (1947 - Present)

The two self-governing independent Dominions of India and Pakistan legally came into existence at midnight on 14–15 August 1947. The partition of India displaced between 10 and 20 million people along religious lines with estimates of the loss of life up to two million in the newly constituted dominions. The ideological character of Pakistan has been disputed, with Jinnah's 11 August speech apparently supportive of the notion that the state was formed simply to protect Muslim interests but the ulama envisioning Pakistan as an Islamic state. After Pakistan's general election, the 1973 Constitution was created by the elected Parliament, which declared Pakistan as an Islamic Republic and Islam as its state religion. In the years preceding Zia-ul-Haq's coup, Pakistan's leftist Prime Minister Zulfikar Ali Bhutto faced vigorous opposition under the revivalist banner of Nizam-e-Mustafa ("Rule of the prophet"). After Zia-ul-Haq's Islamisation and Musharraf's military rule, the 2008 election brought back regular political parties instead of the religious parties.

In Afghanistan, the 1931 Constitution made Hanafi Shariah the state religion, while the 1964 Constitution simply prescribed that the state should conduct its religious ritual according to the Hanafi school. The 1977 Constitution declared Islam the religion of Afghanistan, but made no mention that the state ritual should be Hanafi. In Bangladesh, Islam became the state religion by a constitutional amendment in 1988. For Muslims in India, Pakistan was a triumph which instantly turned into a defeat. By voting in the 1945-6 elections they had stated that Islam required a state of its own. But they were to live an Islamic life without fulfillment after 1947. India, unusually for new countries in the 1950s, successfully sustained a lively democracy. Muslims in the 1960s voted for the Congress, which solicited them, but since then have voted for whichever party appears likely to cater to Muslim interests. Muslims were stereotyped negatively with disloyalty and Pakistani sympathies, particularly after the 1980s. This was partially a tactic to unite Hindus and partly a surrogate for government opposition. Hindu nationalist groups and complicit state officials campaigned against the Babri Mosque, allegedly constructed on Rama's birthplace. A pogrom took place in Gujarat in 2002. The defeat of the BJP brought in a more accommodating government under which a committee was created on the Muslims' socio-economic status. The committee's Sachar report refuted the perception of Muslim "appeasement" by showing the poor and underrepresented status of India's Muslims. Despite individual cases of success, the report pointed out significant barriers faced by the large Muslim population. In India, the administration of Islamic affairs in each state is headed by the Mufti of the State under the supervision of the Grand Mufti of India.

Conversions

The Islamic ambitions of the sultans and Mughals had concentrated in expanding Muslim power and looting, not in seeking converts. Evidence of the absence of systematic programs for conversion is the reason for the concentration of South Asia's Muslim populations outside the main core of the Muslim polities in the northeast and northwest regions of the subcontinent, which were on the peripheries of Muslim states.

Another theory propounds that Indians embraced Islam to obtain privileges. There are several historical cases which apparently bolster this view. Ibn Battuta records that Khilji sultans rewarded converts with robes. Old censuses report that many landed north Indian families became Muslim to avoid penalties for failure to pay taxes. This view could encompass Sind's Amils, Maharashtra's Parasnis and the Kayasthas and Khatris who fostered Islamic traditions under government service. However, this theory cannot resolve the large amount of conversions in the peripheral regions of Bengal and Punjab because state support would diminish further out from their main areas.

One view among historians is that converts seeking to escape the Brahmin dominated caste structure were attracted to Sufi egalitarianism. This notion has been popular among South Asian, particularly Muslim, historians. But there is no relation between the areas with significant numbers of conversions and those regions with Brahminical influence. The areas which the 1872 census found to have Muslim majorities had not only been distant from the core of the Muslim states but had also not been assimilated into the Hindu and Buddhist communal structures by the time of Islam's advent in those areas. Bengali converts were mostly indigenous peoples who only had light contact with Brahminism. A similar scenario applied with the Jat clans, which ultimately made up the mass of the Punjabi Muslim community.

The Sufis did not preach egalitarianism, but played an important role in integrating agricultural settlements with the larger contemporary cultures. In areas where Sufis received grants and supervised clearing of forestry, they had the role of mediating with worldly and divine authority. Richard M. Eaton has described the significance of this in the context of West Punjab and East Bengal, the two main areas to develop Muslim majorities. The partition was eventually made possible because of the concentration of Muslim majorities in northwest and northeast India. The overwhelming majority of the subcontinent's Muslims live in regions which became Pakistan in 1947.

The Islamisation of Bengal and South Asia in general was slow. The process can be seen to comprise three different features. Richard Eaton describes them, in order, as inclusion, identification, and displacement. In the inclusion process, Islamic agencies were added to Bengali cosmology. In the identification process, the Islamic agencies fused with the Bengali deities. In the displacement process, the Islamic agencies took the place of the local deities.

Punjabis and Bengalis retained their pre-Islamic practices. The premier challenge to the purity of Islam in medieval South Asia had neither been from the court nor from the Maratha raids, but from the rural converts, who were ignorant of Islamic requirements, and from the influence of Hinduism in their lives. Punjabis, in the words of Mohammed Mujeeb, relied spiritually on magic while Bengali Muslims were reported to participate in Durga Puja, worship of Shitala and Rakshasa Kali and resorting to Hindu astrologers. In both Punjab and Bengal, Islam was viewed as just one of several methods to seek redress for ordinary problems.

These nominal conversions to Islam, brought about by regional Muslim polities, were followed by reforms, especially after the 17th century, in which Muslims integrated with the larger Muslim world. Improved transport services in the nineteenth century brought Muslim masses into contact with Mecca, which facilitated reformist movements stressing Quranic literalism and making people aware of the differences between Islamic commands and their actual practices.

Islamic reformist movements, such as the Faraizi movement, in the nineteenth century rural Bengal aimed to remove indigenous folk practices from Bengali Islam and commit the population exclusively to Allah and Muhammad. Politically the reform aspect of conversion, emphasizing exclusiveness, continued with the Pakistan movement for a separate Muslim state and a cultural aspect was the assumption of Arab culture.

Islamic culture

Naat (Punjabi and ) is poetry in praise of the Islamic prophet, Muhammad. The practice is popular in South Asia (Bangladesh, Pakistan and India), commonly in Bengali, Punjabi or Urdu. People who recite Naat are known as Naat Khawan or sanaa-khuaan. Exclusive "Praise to Allah" and Allah alone is called Hamd, not to be confused with 'Na'at'.

In Arab countries, lyrics and praises said for Muhammad are called Madih nabawi.

Demographics

Pakistan, Bangladesh, Afghanistan, and the Maldives are Muslim-majority countries. Muslim population in India is 14.5% which still makes them the largest Muslim population outside the Muslim-majority countries.

Movements

Deobandi

The British authorities' Westernization policies effectively destroyed the exclusive hold of the ulama over education and curtailed their administrative influence. In an environment where the Muslim community lacked power, the ulama invested their efforts into maintaining the Muslim society. The most significant efforts were spearheaded by those ulamas who followed Shah Wali Allah and were inspired by Sayyid Ahmed Raza Khan Barelvi's jihad. However, the failure of the Indian Rebellion of 1857 and the British reaction ensured that their jihad would take a different form. Following Barelvi's reformism, they emphasized sharia and study of the revealed rather than rational sciences.

They shunned all British, Hindu and Shia influences and only permitted some Sufi practices while completely proscribing the concept of intercession at the shrines. These ulamas concentrated at the Deoband madrasa, which was established by Muhammad Qasim Nanautavi and Rashid Ahmad Gangohi in 1867. They stressed the scripture. According to them, knowledge of divine law and expected Muslim behavior was a prerequisite for conserving the Muslim community in the British era. Lacking state power, they also encouraged the role of the individual conscience to ensure compliance with the law. They urged followers to ponder over their actions and evoked judgement day.

Barelvi

A movement with Pre-reformist conceptions and fuelled by resistance to reform, was founded in the late 19th century by Ahmed Raza Khan Barelvi. He justified the traditional Sunni Islam associated with obtaining intercession to God from saints, with his scholarly Hanafi credentials. If Deobandis had wanted to preserve Islam as they perceived it to be in the Hanafi texts, the Barelvis desired to preserve Islam as they understood it in the nineteenth century subcontinent. They propagated their ideas eagerly and denounced, sometimes even with violence, the Ahl-i Hadith and Deobandis, rejecting their reformist ideas in favour of the Sufi practices that had been widespread in the Indian subcontinent for centuries.

Ahmad Raza Khan sought to highlight even more highly the status of Muhammad. He emphasized the Sufi belief pertaining to Muhammad's light. By approving the shrines, Ahmad Raza Khan catered to the needs of the illiterate rural population. He shared with his contemporaries the emphasis on Muhammad, who stressed emulation of his life.

Ahl-e Hadith

The Ahl-i Hadith shared the Deobandis' reformist and revivalist roots, but believed that they did not do enough. Their religious ideas were more radical, more sectarian, and they came from a more elite class. They shared the Deobandis' commitment to cleansing Muslim culture of acts not in compliance with the Sharia. But while the Deobandis espoused taqlid and embraced the Islamic scholarship they had inherited, the Ahl-i Hadith repudiated it and directly used the textual sources of the Quran and Sunnah and advocated deploying the methodologies used by the original jurists of the Islamic schools of thought. This methodology meant that the followers would have a heavy individual duty. To enforce this duty, the Ahl i Hadith completely spurned Sufism. They feared judgement day and the writings of Nawab Siddiq Hasan Khan, a prominent member, reflected fear of doomsday.

Controversy

There is a recent contentious and politically politicized debate with regard to whether the correct descriptors are either historic socio-economic class based or religious Hindu Caste based. Muslim communities in South Asia apply a system of religious stratification. Caste among Muslims does not exist on the notion of pure and impure, unlike the Hindu caste system. It developed as a result of relations between the foreign conquerors/ Upper caste Hindus who converted to Islam (Ashraf) (also known as tabqa-i ashrafiyya) and the local lower caste converts (Ajlaf) as well as the continuation of the Indian caste system among local converts. Non-Ashrafs are converts. The neologism Pasmandas include Ajlaf and Arzal Muslims, and Ajlafs' statuses are defined by them being descendants of converts to Islam and are also defined by their pesha (profession). These terms are not used in local sociological vocabulary in places such as Kashmir and Uttar Pradesh, and therefore tell us very little about the functioning of Muslim society.

The Biradari System is how social stratification manifests itself in Pakistan, and to an extent also India. Ashrafism, Syedism, Zatism, Sharifism, Biradarism, and the Quom System are aspects of the caste system among Muslims in South Asia. The South Asian Muslim caste system also includes hierarchical classifications of khandan (dynasty, family, or lineage descent) and nasab (a group based on blood ties/lineage).

See also

Chaand Raat
Abdullah Shah Ghazi
Ali al-Hujwiri
Abu Tawwama
Usman Bengali
'Abd al-Haqq al-Dehlawi
ʽAbd al-Qadir Badayuni

Notes

References

Citations

Sources 

 
 
 
 
 
 
 
 
 
 
 
 
 
 
 
 
 
 
 
 
 

 
Religion in South Asia
Islam in Asia
South Asia